Prathap is a 1990 Indian Kannada-language action film directed and written by V. Somashekhar. The film stars Arjun Sarja, Malashri and Sudharani. The film's music was composed by Hamsalekha.

Plot

Cast 
 Arjun Sarja
 Malashri
 Sudharani
 Devaraj
 Vajramuni
 Doddanna
 Jaggesh
 Jai Jagadish
 Mukhyamantri Chandru
 Dheerendra Gopal
 Lohithaswa
 Maanu
 Negro Johnny

Soundtrack 
The soundtrack of the film was composed and lyrics written by Hamsalekha.  The audio was released by Lahari Music. The song "Prema Baraha" inspired the name of a 2018 film, and the song was reused in the film. Coincidentally, Aishwarya Arjun, who stars in that film, was born during the making of the song. Arjun called the song one of his favourites and keeps it as his caller tune.

References

External links 
 

1990 action films
1990 films
1990s Kannada-language films
Films scored by Hamsalekha
Indian action films